The Seven Holy Founders of the Servite Order, by name Bonfilius, Alexis, Manettus, Amideus, Hugh, Sostene and Buonagiunta of Florence, were seven holy men of the town of Florence whom became bound to each other in a spiritual friendship that were eventually called by the Virgin Mother of God in a vision that they reportedly all shared in one and the same moment (though at first each was unaware that the other saw what he saw), whom they practised an intense devotion towards, to 'Leave the World, the Better to Serve Almighty God'.  

Bonfilius of Florence was born Bonfilius Monaldi (Buonfiglio dei Monaldi), Alexis of Florence was born Alexis Falconieri (1200 – 17 February 1310), Manettus of Florence was born Benedict dell'Antella (Benedetto dell' Antella), Amideus of Florence was born Bartholemew Amidei (also Bartolomeo degli Amidei; died 1265), Hugh of Florence was born Ricovero Uguccioni (Hugh dei Lippi Uggucioni (Ricovero dei Lippi-Ugguccioni)), Sostene of Florence was born Gerardino Sostegni (Gherardino di Sostegno) and Buonagiunta of Florence was born John Manetti (Giovanni di Buonagiunta (Bonajuncta)).

The founders

Alexis Falconieri

Falconieri was one of the seven founders of the Servite Order, who are celebrated together on the anniversary of his death.

Life
He was the son of Bernardo Falconieri, a merchant prince of Florence, and one of the leaders of the Republic. His family belonged to the Guelph party, and opposed the Imperialists whenever they could consistently with their political principles.

Falconieri grew up in the practice of the most profound humility. He became a wealthy noble in one of Italy's most wealthy and cultured cities. Falconieri joined the Laudesi, a pious confraternity of the Blessed Virgin, and there met the six future companions of his life of sanctity. According to tradition, he was favoured with an apparition of the Mother of God, 15 August 1233, as were these companions. The seven soon afterwards founded the Order of the Servites. Falconieri at once abandoned all, and retired to La Camarzia, a house on the outskirts of the town, and the following year to Monte Senario. Falconieri was bestowed the title of Founder and Mystic.

With humility, he traversed, as a mendicant, in quest of alms for his brethren, the streets of the city through which he had lately moved as a prominent citizen. So deep and sincere was his humility that, though he lived to the great age of hundred and ten years, he always refused to enter the priesthood, of which he deemed himself unworthy.

His duties were confined principally to the material needs of the various communities in which he lived. In 1252 the new church at Cafaggio, on the outskirts of Florence, was completed under his care, with the financial assistance of Chiarissimo Falconieri. Giuliana Falconieri, his niece, was trained in sanctity under his personal direction.

The influence exerted on his countrymen by Falconieri and his companions may be gathered from the fact that in a few years ten thousand persons had enrolled themselves under the banner of the Blessed Virgin in the Servite Order.

He died in Monte Senario at about 110 years of age on 17 February 1310.

His shrine and entombed body is near the church of the Santissima Annunziata in Florence. Clement XI declared Falconieri worthy of the veneration of the faithful, 1 December 1717, and accorded the same honour to his six companions on 3 July 1725.

Amadeus of the Amidei

Amadeus of the Amidei (died 1265) was also known as Bartolomeo degli Amidei.  He was one of the seven founders of the Servite Order in 1233. He was born into the Amidei family in the Republic of Florence, and died at Monte Senario in 1265.  His feast day is with the other six, on 17 February.

Hugh dei Lippi Ugguccioni
Hugh dei Lippi Ugguccioni was one of the founders of the Order, who were collectively known as the Seven Holy Founders.  He served as the vicar general of the Servites in Germany, having initially followed Philip Benizi to France and Germany. He died in Germany on 3 May 1282

Legacy
Pope Leo XIII canonized them all on 15 January 1888.  After the canonization of the seven founders, their feast was inserted in the General Roman Calendar for celebration on 11 February, the anniversary of the granting of canonical approval to the order in 1304. In 1909, 11 February became the feast of Our Lady of Lourdes, and the feast of the seven founders was moved to 12 February. In the 1969 revision of the calendar, 17 February, the date of death of Alexis Falconieri was judged more appropriate.

References

Bibliography
Holweck, F. G., A Biographical Dictionary of the Saints. St. Louis, MO: B. Herder Book Co., 1924.

External links
17 February saints at St. Patrick Catholic Church

Servites
14th-century Christian saints
Medieval Italian saints
13th-century Christian saints
Canonizations by Pope Leo XIII
Beatifications by Pope Clement XI